Walid Sadek (born in Beirut, Lebanon, 1966) is a Lebanese artist and writer. He is a professor at the Department of Fine Arts and Art History of the American University of Beirut, and held its chairmanship from 2017 to 2020.

Life and work
Walid Sadek uses poetic and metaphoric language to evoke on post war Lebanon. In 1999, he produced Bigger than Picasso a tiny and unexpected book using word and image to criticize a political situation in the country.

Sadek, who has regularly collaborated with Beirut-based artist centre Ashkal Alwan, has participated in numerous exhibitions and events worldwide. In 2010, he presented his first solo exhibition at the Beirut Art Center. He was guest editor of the academic journal Third Text on issue 117, July 2012, titled "Not, Not Arab".

Publications
 Fi annani akbar min Picasso (bigger than Picasso), (Beirut, Ayloul Festival, 1999)
Al-Kasal [Indolence] with Bilal Khbeiz (Beirut: The 3rd World, 1999)
The Ruin to Come, Essays from a protracted war (Motto Books, Taipei Biennale, 2016)
Collected essays, written in Beirut over a period of 10 years between 2006 and 2016, look at the conditions of living under a temporality theorized as the "protracted now" of a civil war, one structurally capable of perpetuating the conditions of its own dominance.

Selected exhibitions

Solo exhibitions
Place at Last Walid Sadek, Beirut Art Center, 2010
Walid Sadek '"On the labour of missing", Galerie Tanit, Beirut, 2012

Group exhibitions
Ashkal Alwan – Hamra Street Project, Beirut, 2000
Contemporary Arab Representations, Beirut/Lebanon, Witte de With, Rotterdam, 2002 
Home Works III – A Forum of Cultural Practices, Beirut, 2005
Out of Beirut, Modern Art Oxford, Oxford, 2006
Foreword, Pavilion of Lebanon, 52nd Venice Biennale, 2007
Home Works IV, Galerie Sfeir Semler, Beirut, 2008
Lebanon Now, Darat al Funun, Amman, 2008
 The 4th Auckland Triennial, Auckland, 2010 
  Sharjah Biennial 10: Plot for a Biennial, Sharjah, 2011
 Seeing is Believing, KW Berlin, 2011
 Home Works 6 Exhibition, Artheum, Beirut, 2013
 Unnamed exhibition with Gheith Al-Amine, Aissa Deebi, Bassam Kahwagi, Jacko Restikian and Shawki Youssef, Galerie Tanit, Beirut, 2014

References

Artists from Beirut
1966 births
Living people
Lebanese contemporary artists
Writers from Beirut